Mitsuya Kurokawa (18 September 1951 – 6 June 2020) was a Japanese guitarist who was most known to be in 1986 Omega Tribe.

Biography 
Kurokawa was born in Nakano, Tokyo. He dropped out of high school to pursue band activities.

In 1977, he participated in EastWest '77 with the band Riverside, and they won 2nd place alongside Casiopea.

Backing band and 1986 Omega Tribe 
From 1979 to 1985, Kurokawa was a part of the backing bands of Hiromi Iwasaki and Momoko Kikuchi as a part of the Pineapple Company. In 1986, he left the backing bands and joined the band 1986 Omega Tribe as a second guitarist and band leader.

After the fifth single, "Stay Girl Stay Pure", Kurokawa decided to leave the band due to health-related reasons. Kurokawa stopped playing music due to his condition, but resumed his activities in 2007 as a solo artist, and was active in various fields and supported Brand New Omega Tribe's vocalist Arai Masahito and the band KEICO.

Death 
On June 6, 2020, Kurokawa died from sepsis. His death was announced by his son on Twitter. His fellow band members from 1986 Omega Tribe, such as Carlos Toshiki and Shinji Takashima offered their condolences.

References

External references 
YouTube channel

Japanese musicians
1951 births
2020 deaths
Deaths from sepsis
Omega Tribe (Japanese band) members